Rita Thijs (born 7 February 1958) is a Belgian sprinter. She competed in the women's 4 × 400 metres relay at the 1976 Summer Olympics.

References

1958 births
Living people
Athletes (track and field) at the 1976 Summer Olympics
Belgian female sprinters
Belgian female middle-distance runners
Olympic athletes of Belgium
Place of birth missing (living people)
Olympic female sprinters
20th-century Belgian women